Pensée: Immanuel Velikovsky Reconsidered ("IVR") was a special series of ten issues of the magazine Pensée advancing the pseudoscientific theories of Immanuel Velikovsky. It was produced to "encourage continuing critical analysis of all questions raised by Velikovsky's work", published between May 1972 and Winter 1974-75 by the Student Academic Freedom Forum, whose president was David N. Talbott, with the assistance and cooperation of Lewis and Clark College, Portland, Oregon. Velikovsky -- "the man whose work was being examined 'objectively'" insinuated himself into the editing of the May 1972 issue, just as he had done earlier for the April 1967 "Velikovsky" issue of Yale Scientific Magazine.

It achieved a circulation of between 10,000 - 20,000, with the first issue reprinted twice totalling 75,000 copies, and resulted in a book, Velikovsky Reconsidered containing selected articles, many of them partisan.

History

In the final issue of Pensée IVR, the publisher recalled that the original magazine was:

Science magazine attributed the then increased support for Velikovsky's ideas, to Pensée.

Staff

The staff consisted of publisher David N. Talbott and his brother Stephen L. Talbott as editor, and built up to five associate editors: Lewis M. Greenberg, Ralph Juergens, William Mullen, C.J. Ransom, and Lynn E. Rose. Professor of Social Theory, Alfred de Grazia noted that:

Conferences
The "Immanuel Velikovsky Reconsidered" period also included sponsoring two three-day symposia which were attended by Velikovsky. The first ever "Velikovsky Symposium" held 16–18 August 1972, at Lewis and Clark College (who was also co-sponsor) convened 50 invited scholars, many from the ranks of Velikovsky's supporters, with 200 attendees. In June 1974, "Velikovsky and the Recent History of the Solar System" at McMaster University, Hamilton, Ontario, convened 38 invited scholars with a generally higher and non-aligned profile than in 1972, including such mainstream scientists as David Morrison (Univ. of Hawaii), James Warwick (Univ. of Colorado), and Derek York (Univ. of Toronto), and registered over 350 attendees.

Controversy
A number of magazine and journals refused to accept advertisements for Pensée, including American Scientist, Sky and Telescope, and, Scientific American whose publishers wrote:

However, many magazines and journals did accept advertisements for Pensée, including the Bulletin of the Atomic Scientists, Science, Science News, and Physics Today.

Demise
At the end of the ten issue Velikovsky feature, the subscribers were informed that "Pensee may not survive the future" in the back of tenth issue while soliciting subscription renewals for up to three years on the inside front cover while the magazine was "seriously encumbered with debts".  Publication ceased with the tenth issue and in early 1976 subscribers were informed "Pensée has discontinued publication indefinitely".

Velikovsky himself noted "When Pensée (1972-1974) completed the planned ten issues on the theme 'Velikovsky Reconsidered' I made it clear that I would not continue my cooperation as a regular contributor, not only because of a lack of time, but also because of disagreement with certain aspects of their editorial policy."

Successor
The successor Research Communications Network with Stephen L. Talbott as coordinator, which was "committed to no man and no theory", sent a newsletter to its "more than 16,000 U.S. members" six months later. The Network served as a clearinghouse for developments in and information about catastrophism, with special attention to Robert V. Gentry's radiohalos and David N. Talbott's "Saturn Thesis", as well as offering a book service through its mailings of newsletters and resources fliers. The Network ceased operations in spring 1978 with a single sheet flier announcing a book close-out sale and an offering of Velikovsky's Ramses II and his Time.

See also
 Kronos: A Journal of Interdisciplinary Synthesis'' (Velikovskian publication)

References

Bibliography

External links
 Pensée -- Immanuel Velikovsky Reconsidered - Tables of contents of all ten issues

Pseudoscience literature
Pseudohistory
Student newspapers published in Oregon
Defunct newspapers published in Oregon
1972 establishments in Oregon